This is a list of mammals of South Australia. It includes all mammals recorded in South Australia since European settlement, including some known only from subfossil remains, and including non-feral introduced species.

Except where otherwise referenced, this list is based upon .

Subclass Prototheria

Order Monotremata

Family Ornithorhynchidae
 Ornithorhynchus anatinus (platypus)

Family Tachyglossidae
 Tachyglossus aculeatus (short-beaked echidna)

Subclass Marsupialia

Order Dasyuromorphia

Family Myrmecobiidae
 Myrmecobius fasciatus (numbat) reintroduced

Family Dasyuridae
Subfamily Dasyurinae
 Dasycercus byrnei (kowari)
 Dasycercus cristicauda (mulgara)
 Dasyurus geoffroii (western quoll) locally extinct
 Dasyurus maculatus (tiger quoll) locally extinct
 Dasyurus viverrinus (eastern quoll) locally extinct
 Pseudantechinus macdonnellensis (fat-tailed pseudantechinus)

Subfamily Phascogalinae
 Antechinus flavipes (yellow-footed antechinus)
 Antechinus minimus (swamp antechinus)
 Phascogale calura (red-tailed phascogale) locally extinct
 Phascogale tapoatafa (brush-tailed phascogale)

Subfamily Planigalinae
 Ningaui ridei (Wonai ningaui)
 Ningaui yvonneae (southern ningaui)
 Planigale gilesi (Giles' planigale)
 Planigale cf. ingrami (long-tailed planigale)
 Planigale tenuirostris (narrow-nosed planigale)

Subfamily Sminthopsinae
 Antechinomys laniger (kultarr)
 Sminthopsis aitkeni (Kangaroo Island dunnart)
 Sminthopsis crassicaudata (fat-tailed dunnart)
 Sminthopsis dolichura (little long-tailed dunnart)
 Sminthopsis hirtipes (hairy-footed dunnart)
 Sminthopsis macroura (stripe-faced dunnart)
 Sminthopsis murina (common dunnart)
 Sminthopsis ooldea (Ooldea dunnart)
 Sminthopsis psammophila (sandhill dunnart)
 Sminthopsis youngsoni (lesser hairy-footed dunnart)

Order Peramelemorphia

Family †Chaeropodidae
 †Chaeropus ecaudatus (pig-footed bandicoot)

Family Peramelidae
Subfamily Peramelinae
 Isoodon auratus (golden bandicoot) locally extinct
 Isoodon obesulus (southern brown bandicoot)
 Perameles bougainville (western barred bandicoot) locally extinct
 †Perameles eremiana (desert bandicoot)
 Perameles gunnii (eastern barred bandicoot) locally extinct

Subfamily Thylacomyinae
 Macrotis lagotis (bilby)
 †Macrotis leucura (lesser bilby)

Order Notoryctemorphia

Family Notoryctidae
 Notoryctes typhlops (marsupial mole)

Order Diprotodontia

Family Phascolarctidae
 Phascolarctos cinereus (koala) reintroduced

Family Vombatidae
 Lasiorhinus latifrons (southern hairy-nosed wombat)
 Vombatus ursinus (common wombat)

Family Phalangeridae
 Trichosurus vulpecula (common brushtail possum)

Family Potoroidae
 Bettongia lesueur (burrowing bettong)
 Bettongia penicillata (brush-tailed bettong)
 †Caloprymnus campestris (desert rat-kangaroo)
 †Potorous tridactylus (long-nosed potoroo)

Family Macropodidae
 Lagorchestes hirsutus (rufous hare-wallaby) locally extinct
 †Lagorchestes leporides (eastern hare-wallaby)
 Macropus fuliginosus (western grey kangaroo)
 Macropus giganteus (eastern grey kangaroo)
 Notamacropus eugenii (tammar wallaby) reintroduced
N. e. decres 
N. e. eugenii reintroduced
 †Notamacropus greyi (toolache wallaby)
 Notamacropus rufogriseus (red-necked wallaby)
 Osphranter robustus (euro)
 Osphranter rufus (red kangaroo)
 †Onychogalea lunata (crescent nailtail wallaby)
 Petrogale lateralis (black-footed rock-wallaby)
P. l. pearsoni (Pearson Island rock-wallaby)
 Petrogale xanthopus (yellow-footed rock-wallaby)
 Thylogale billardierii (Tasmanian pademelon) locally extinct
 Wallabia bicolor (swamp wallaby)

Family Burramyidae
 Cercartetus concinnus (western pygmy-possum)
 Cercartetus lepidus (little pygmy-possum)
 Cercartetus nanus (eastern pygmy-possum)

Family Pseudocheiridae
 Pseudocheirus peregrinus (common ringtail possum)

Family Petauridae
 Petaurus australis (yellow-bellied glider)
 Petaurus notatus (Krefft's glider)
 Petaurus norfolcensis (squirrel glider) locally extinct

Acrobatidae
 Acrobates pygmaeus (feathertail glider)

Subclass Eutheria

Order Chiroptera

Suborder Megachiroptera

Family Pteropodidae
 Pteropus poliocephalus (grey-headed flying-fox)
 Pteropus scapulatus (little red flying-fox)

Suborder Microchiroptera

Family Emballonuridae
 Saccolaimus flaviventris (yellow-bellied sheathtail bat)
 Taphozous hilli (sheathtail bat)

Family Megadermatidae
 Macroderma gigas (ghost bat) locally extinct

Family Molossidae
 Ozimops petersi (inland free-tailed bat)
 Ozimops planiceps (southern free-tailed bat)
 Ozimops ridei (eastern free-tailed bat)
 Tadarida australis (white-striped freetail-bat)

Family Vespertilionidae
Subfamily Miniopterinae
 Minipterus schreibersii (large bentwing-bat)

Subfamily Nytophilinae
 Nyctophilus geoffroyi (lesser long-eared bat)
 Nyctophilus gouldi (Gould's long-eared bat)
 Nyctophilus timoriensis (greater long-eared bat)

Subfamily Vespertilioninae
 Chalinolobus gouldii (Gould's wattled bat)
 Chalinolobus morio (chocolate wattled bat)
 Chalinolobus picatus (little pied bat)
 Falsistrellus tasmaniensis (eastern falsistrelle)
 Myotis macropus (southern myotis)
 Scotorepens balstoni (inland broad-nosed bat)
 Scotorepens greyii (little broad-nosed bat)
 Vespadelus baverstocki (inland forest bat)
 Vespadelus darlingtoni (large forest bat)
 Vespadelus finlaysoni (Finlayson's cave bat)
 Vespadelus regulus (southern forest bat)
 Vespadelus vulturnus (little forest bat)

Order Carnivora

Family Canidae
Canis familiaris dingo (dingo)
Canis familiaris x C. f. dingo (dingo-domestic dog hybrid)
Vulpes vulpes (red fox) introduced

Family Otariidae
Subfamily Arctocephalinae
 Arctocephalus pusillus (Australian fur-seal)
 Arctocephalus pusillus doriferus
Arctophoca forsteri (long-nosed fur-seal)
Arctophoca tropicalis (subantarctic fur-seal)

Subfamily Otariinae
 Neophoca cinerea (Australian sea-lion)

Family Phocidae
 Hydrurga leptonyx (leopard seal)
 Leptonychotes weddellii (Weddell seal)
 Lobodon carcinophaga (crab-eater seal)
 Mirounga leonina (southern elephant seal)
 Ommatophoca rossii (Ross seal)

Order Cetacea

Suborder Mysticeti

Family Balaenidae
 Eubalaena australis (southern right whale)

Family Neobalaenidae
 Caperea marginata (pygmy right whale)

Family Balaenopteridae
 Balaenoptera acutorostrata (dwarf minke whale) 
 Balaenoptera bonaerensis (Antarctic minke whale)
 Balaenoptera borealis (sei whale)
 Balaenoptera edeni (Bryde's whale)
 Balaenoptera omurai (Omura's whale)
 Balaenoptera musculus (blue whale)
 Balaenoptera physalus (fin whale)
 Megaptera novaeangliae (humpback whale)

Suborder Odontoceti

Family Delphinidae
 Delphinus delphis (common dolphin)
 Globicephala macrorhynchus (short-finned pilot whale)
 Globicephala melas (long-finned pilot whale)
 Grampus griseus (Risso's dolphin)
 Orcinus orca (killer whale)
 Pseudorca crassidens (false killer whale)
Sagmatias obscurus (dusky dolphin)
 Tursiops truncatus (common bottlenose dolphin)
 Tursiops aduncus (Indian Ocean bottlenose dolphin)

Family Phocoenidae
 Phocoena dioptrica (spectacled porpoise)

Family Physeteridae
 Physeter macrocephalus (sperm whale)

Family Kogiidae
 Kogia breviceps (pygmy sperm whale)
 Kogia sima (dwarf sperm whale)

Family Ziphiidae
 Berardius arnuxii (Arnoux's beaked whale)
 Hyperoodon planifrons (southern bottlenose whale)
 Mesoplodon bowdoini (Andrews beaked whale)
 Mesoplodon grayi (Gray's beaked whale)
 Mesoplodon hectori (Hector's beaked whale)
 Mesoplodon layardii (strap-toothed whale)
 Tasmacetus shepherdi (Shepherd's beaked whale)
 Ziphius cavirostris (Cuvier's beaked whale)

Order Artiodactyla

Family Cervidae
 Dama dama (common fallow deer) introduced

Order Rodentia

Family Muridae
Subfamily Hydromyinae
 Conilurus albipes (white-footed tree-rat) locally extinct 
 Hydromys chrysogaster (water-rat)
 Leggadina forresti (Forrest's mouse)
 †Leporillus apicalis (lesser stick-nest rat)
 Leporillus conditor (greater stick-nest rat) 
 Notomys alexis (spinifex hopping-mouse)
 †Notomys amplus (short-tailed hopping-mouse)
 Notomys cervinus (fawn hopping-mouse)
 Notomys fuscus (dusky hopping-mouse)
 †Notomys longicaudatus (long-tailed hopping-mouse)
 Notomys mitchellii (Mitchell's hopping-mouse)
 Pseudomys apodemoides (silky mouse)
 Pseudomys australis (plains mouse)
 Pseudomys bolami (Bolam's mouse)
 Pseudomys desertor (desert mouse)
 Pseudomys fieldi (Shark Bay mouse) locally extinct 
 †Pseudomys gouldii (Gould's mouse)
 Pseudomys hermannsburgensis (sandy inland mouse)
 Pseudomys shortridgei (heath rat)

Subfamily Murinae
 Mus musculus (house mouse) introduced
 Rattus fuscipes (bush rat)
 Rattus lutreolus (swamp rat)
 Rattus norvegicus (brown rat) introduced
 Rattus rattus (black rat) introduced
 Rattus tunneyi (pale field-rat) locally extinct
 Rattus villosissimus (long-haired rat)

Order Lagomorpha

Family Leporidae
 Lepus europaeus (European hare) introduced
 Oryctolagus cuniculus (European rabbit) introduced

Notes

References

 
South Australia